The 1976 Australian Formula 2 Championship was a CAMS sanctioned motor racing title for drivers of Australian Formula 2 racing cars.
The title was contested over a four round series:
 Round 1, Calder, Victoria, 23 May
 Round 2, Hume Weir, New South Wales, 13 June
 Round 3, Oran Park, New South Wales, 1 August
 Round 4, Phillip Island, Victoria, 21 November
Championship points were awarded on a 9-6-4-3-2-1 basis to the top six placegetters at each round.

Results

References

Further reading
 Jim Shepherd, A History of Australian Motor Sport, 1980, pages 84 & 85
 Crawford's Lucky Day, Chequered Flag, June 1976, pages 58 & 59
 Miedecke Comes Through, Chequered Flag, August 1976, pages 63 & 64
 Crawford, Geoghegan Wrap Up Titles, Racing Car News, January 1977, pages 30 & 31

Australian Formula 2 Championship
Formula 2 Championship